Martin Goodman (born Moe Goodman; January 18, 1908 – June 6, 1992) was an American publisher of pulp magazines, paperback books, men's adventure magazines, and comic books, launching the company that would become Marvel Comics.

Biography 
Moe Goodman, who would later adopt the name Martin, was the oldest son of 17 recorded children of Isaac Goodman (b. 1872) and Anna Gleichenhaus (b. 1875). His parents were Jewish immigrants who had met in the United States after separately moving from their native Vilna,
Lithuania, then part of Russian Empire. The family lived at different homes in the New York City borough of Brooklyn. As a young man, Moe traveled around the country during the Great Depression, living in hobo camps.

Pulp magazines and Timely Comics 
Circa late 1929, future Archie Comics co-founder Louis Silberkleit, then circulation manager at the magazine distribution company Eastern Distributing Corp., hired Goodman for his department, assigning him clients that included publisher Hugo Gernsback. Goodman later became circulation manager himself, but the company went bankrupt in October 1932. Goodman then joined Silberkleit and other investors as part owner of Mutual Magazine Distributors, and was named editor of Silberkleit's new sister company, the publisher Newsstand Publications Inc., at 53 Park Place, also known as 60 Murray Street, in Manhattan.

Goodman's first publication was the Newsstand Publications pulp magazine Western Supernovel Magazine, premiering with cover-date May 1933. After the first issue he renamed it Complete Western Book Magazine, beginning with cover-date July 1933. Goodman's pulp magazines included All Star Adventure Fiction, Complete Western Book, Mystery Tales, Real Sports, Star Detective, the science fiction magazine Marvel Science Stories and the jungle-adventure title Ka-Zar, starring its Tarzan-like namesake.  These were published under a variety of names, all owned by Goodman and sometimes marked as "Red Circle".

In 1937, returning from his honeymoon in Europe, Goodman and his wife had tickets on the Hindenburg, but were unable to secure seats together, so they took alternative transportation instead, avoiding the Hindenburg disaster. A story that they took a plane is incorrect, as commercial transatlantic flights were not available until 1939. In 1937, transatlantic flights were still stunts that made aviators such as Dick Merrill and Beryl Markham famous and recipients of offers from Hollywood for movies.

In 1939, with the emerging medium of comic books proving hugely popular, and the first superheroes setting the trend, Goodman contracted with newly formed comic-book "packager" Funnies, Inc. to supply material for a test comic book, Marvel Comics #1, cover-dated October 1939 and published by his newly formed Timely Publications. It featured the first appearances of the hit characters the Human Torch and the Sub-Mariner, and quickly sold out 80,000 copies. Goodman produced a second printing, cover-dated November 1939, that then sold an approximate 800,000 copies. With a hit on his hands, Goodman began assembling an in-house staff, hiring Funnies, Inc. writer-artist Joe Simon as editor, and Timely's first official employee. Goodman then formed Timely Comics, Inc., beginning with comics cover-dated April 1941 or Spring 1941. Timely Comics became the umbrella name for the several paper corporations that comprised Goodman's comic-book division, which in ensuing decades would evolve into Marvel Comics.

In 1941, Timely published its third major character, the patriotic superhero Captain America by Simon and artist Jack Kirby. The success of Captain America #1 (March 1941) led to an expansion of staff, with Simon bringing freelancer Kirby on staff and subsequently hiring inker Syd Shores "to be Timely's third employee." Simon and Kirby departed Timely after 10 issues of Captain America, and Goodman appointed his wife’s cousin, Stan Lee, already there as an editorial assistant, as Timely's editor, a position Lee would hold for decades.

With the post-war lessening of interest in superheroes, Goodman established a pattern of directing Lee to follow a variety of genres as the market seemed to trend, such as romance in 1948, horror in 1951, Westerns in 1955 and Kaiju monsters in 1958. He could be highly derivative In this regard, such as ordering the title character of Patsy Walker, America's #1 Teenager to have similar crosshatching in her hair as that of Archie Comics' popular Archie Andrews.

The name "Timely Comics" went into disuse after Goodman began using the globe logo of the newsstand-distribution company he owned, Atlas, starting with the covers of comic books dated November 1951. This united a line put out by the same publisher, staff and freelancers through 59 shell companies, from Animirth Comics to Zenith Publications. Throughout the 1950s, the company formerly known as Timely was called Atlas Comics.

Red Circle

Goodman, whose business strategy involved using several corporate names for various publishing ventures, sometimes attempted branding his line with the logo "Red Circle," which comics historian Les Daniels calls "a halfhearted attempt to establish an identity for what was usually described loosely as 'the Goodman group' ... a red disk surrounded by a black ring that bore the phrase 'A Red Circle Magazine.' But it appeared only intermittently, when someone remembered to put it on [a pulp magazine's] cover. Historian Jess Nevins, conversely, writes that, "Timely Publications [was how] Goodman's group [of companies] had become known; before this, it was known as 'Red Circle' because of the logo that Goodman had put on his pulp magazines. ... " The Grand Comics Database identifies 21 Goodman comic books from 1944 to 1959 with Red Circle, Inc. branding, and one 1948 comic under Red Circle Magazines Corp.

Magazine Management and Lion Books 
As the market for pulp magazines waned, Goodman, in addition to comic books, transitioned to conventional magazines—published through a concern dubbed Magazine Management Company at least as far back as 1947—and in 1949 founded Lion Books, a paperback line. Goodman used the name Red Circle Books for the first seven titles plus an additional two later. Most were novels, but there was a smattering of mostly sports-oriented nonfiction. Goodman eventually developed two lines, the 25¢ Lion and the 35¢ Lion Library.

New American Library bought Lion in 1957, and several Lion titles were reprinted under its Signet label. Authors that Lion published included such notables as Robert Bloch, David Goodis and Jim Thompson. The first Lion editor was Arnold Hano.

Marvel Comics 

In mid-1961, following rival DC Comics' successful revival of superheroes a few years earlier, Goodman assigned his comics editor, Stan Lee, to follow the trend again. He said, "Stan, we gotta put out a bunch of heroes. You know, there's a market for it." Lee's wife suggested that Lee experiment with stories he preferred, since he was planning on changing careers and had nothing to lose. In response, Lee and artist Jack Kirby created The Fantastic Four #1 (cover-dated Nov. 1961), giving their superheroes a flawed humanity in which they bickered, worried about money and behaved more like everyday people than noble archetypes. That series became the first major success of what would become Marvel Comics. The newly naturalistic comics changed the industry. Lee, Kirby, such artists as Steve Ditko, Don Heck, Dick Ayers, John Romita Sr., Gene Colan, and John Buscema, and eventually writers including Roy Thomas and Archie Goodwin, ushered in a string of hit characters, including Spider-Man, Iron Man, the Hulk, Daredevil, and the X-Men.

In fall 1968, Goodman sold Magazine Management to the Perfect Film & Chemical Corporation. Goodman remained as publisher until 1972, which included supporting Lee's decision to disregard the Comics Code Authority's disallowance of an The Amazing Spider-Man anti-drug themed story-arc requested by the US Department of Health, Education and Welfare, which discredited the censor. Two years later he founded a new comics company, Seaboard Periodicals, which published under a new Atlas Comics imprint and is known to collectors as "Atlas/Seaboard Comics". It shut down the following year.

Perfect Film & Chemical renamed itself Cadence Industries in 1973, the first of many post-Goodman changes, mergers, and acquisitions that led to what became the 21st-century corporation Marvel Entertainment Group.

Men's magazines 
Goodman's Magazine Management Company also published  such men's adventure magazines as Bachelor, For Men Only, Male, Stag and Swank, edited during the 1950s by Noah Sarlat. As well, there was such ephemera as a one-shot black-and-white "nudie cutie" comic, The Adventures of Pussycat (Oct. 1968), that reprinted some stories of the sexy, tongue-in-cheek secret-agent strip that ran in some of his men's magazines. Marvel/Atlas writers Stan Lee, Larry Lieber and Ernie Hart and artists Wally Wood, Al Hartley, Jim Mooney and Bill Everett and "good girl art" cartoonist Bill Ward contributed.

By the late 1960s, these titles had begun evolving into erotic magazines, with pictorials about dancers and swimsuit models replaced by bikinis and discreet nude shots, with gradually fewer fiction stories.

Another division, Humorama, published digest-sized magazines of girlie cartoons by Ward, Bill Wenzel and Archie Comics great Dan De Carlo, as well as black-and-white photos of pin-up models including Bettie Page, Eve Meyer, stripper Lili St. Cyr and actresses Joi Lansing, Tina Louise, Irish McCalla, Julie Newmar and others. Abe Goodman, a relative, headed this division. Titles included Breezy, Gaze, Gee-Whiz,  Joker, Stare, and Snappy. They were published from at least the mid-1950s to mid-1960s.

In addition to men's adventure magazines and Humorama, Goodman also published many other magazines covering a plethora of topics including several male-oriented glossy 5" × 7" digests in the early to mid-1950s (e.g. Focus, Photo, and Eye) prior to the development of Humorama, as well as many romance, film and television, sports and other general interest magazines spanning several decades.

Personal life
Goodman was married to Jean Davis, with whom he had children Iden, Charles, and Amy. He died on June 6, 1992, at his home in Palm Beach, Florida, aged 84.

Son Charles, known as "Chip", founded his own publishing company that produced 80 magazines in home, fitness, pornography and other niches, before dying of pneumonia in 1996, aged 55. Grandson Jason Goodman circa 2010 announced a partnership with Ardden Entertainment to relaunch Goodman's 1970s Atlas Comics.

Goodman's magazines

Pulp magazines 

 Adventure Trails
 All Baseball Stories
 All Basketball Stories
 All Football Stories
 All Star Detective Stories
 All Star Fiction / All Star Adventure Fiction / All Star Adventure Magazine
 American Sky Devils
 The Angel Detective
 Best Detective
 Best Love Magazine
 Best Sports Magazine
 Best Western / Best Western Novels
 Big Baseball Stories
 Big Book Sports
 Big Sports Magazine
 Children's Book Digest
 Complete Adventure Magazine
 Complete Detective
 Complete Sports / Complete Sports Action Stories for Men
 Complete War Novels
 Complete Western Book Magazine
 Cowboy Action Novels
 Detective Mysteries
 Detective Short Stories
 Dynamic Science Stories
 Five Western Novels
 Gunsmoke Western
 Justice (digest)
 Ka-Zar / Ka-Zar the Great
 Marvel Science Stories / Marvel Tales /Marvel Stories / Marvel Science Fiction
 Masked Rider Western (later sold to Thrilling)
 Modern Love
 Modern Love Stories
 Mystery Tales

 Quick Trigger Western Novels Magazine
 Ranch Love Stories
 Real Confessions
 Real Love
 Real Mystery Magazine / Real Mystery
 Real Sports
 Romantic Short Stories
 Secret Story
 Six-Gun Western
 Sky Devils
 Sports Action
 Sports Leaders Magazine
 Sports Short Stories
 Star Detective Magazine
 Star Sports Magazine
 3-Book Western (digest)
 Three Western Novels / Three Western Novels Magazine
 Top-Notch Detective
 Top-Notch Western
 True Crime / True Crime Magazine
 Two Daring Love Novels
 Two-Gun Western Novels Magazine / Two-Gun Western /Two-Gun Western Novels / 2-Gun Western
 Uncanny Stories
 Uncanny Tales
 War Stories Magazine
 Western Fiction Magazine / Western Fiction Monthly / Western Fiction
 Western Magazine (Digest)
 Western Novelettes
 Western Short Stories
 Western Supernovel
 Wild West Stories & Complete Novel Magazine
 Wild Western Novels / Wild Western Novels Magazine

Romance and true crime magazines 
 My Confession
 My Romance
 True Secrets

Humor magazines 
Best Cartoons from the Editors of Male & Stag, Magazine Management: published at least from 1973 to 1975)
 Cartoon Capers: published at least from vol. 4, #2 (1969) to vol. 10, #3 (1975)
 Cartoon Laughs: confirmed extant: vol 12, #3 (1973)

Men's-adventure and erotic magazines 
Launched pre-1970
 Bachelor initially titled Men in Adventure 1959
 For Men Only: confirmed at least from vol. 4, #11 (Dec. 1957) through at least vol. 26, #3 (March 1976)
Published by Canam Publishers (at least 1957), Newsstand Publications Inc. (at least 1966–1967), Perfect Film Inc. (at least 1968), Magazine Management Co. Inc. (at least 1970) 
 Male: published at least vol. 1, #2 (July 1950) through 1977 
 Stag: at least 314 issues published February 1942 – February 1976
Published by Official Communications Inc. (1951), Official Magazines (Feb. 1952 - March 1958), Atlas (July 1958 - Oct. 1968), Magazine Management (Dec. 1970 to end) 
 Stag Annual: at least 18 issues published 1964–1975
Published by Atlas (1964–1968), Magazine Management (1970–1975)
 Swank

1970s and later
 FILM International: covering X-rated movies

True crime magazines 
 Action Life Magazine: published at least volume 4, #4 (Nov. 1954), Atlas Magazine Pub.
 Complete Detective Cases: published at least between March 1941 and Fall 1954, Postal Pub. Inc.
 Leading Detective Cases: published at least May 1947, Zenith Pub. Corp.
 National Detective Cases: published at least March 1941.

Movie magazines 
 Screen Stars: published at least October 1944.

Other magazines 

Celebrity: extant in at least 1977
It's Amazing: issue #1 dated only 1949, published by Stadium Publishing.
Movie World 
Popular Digest: volume 1 #1, September 1939.
Sex Health: issue #1 dated August 1937.

Notes

References

External links
 
 A List of Pre-Golden Age Marvel Magazines 
 Humorama
 "Louis Silberkleit, Co-Founder of Archie Comics, Dies at 81", The New York Times February 25, 1986, with correction published February 27, 1986.

1908 births
1992 deaths
20th-century American Jews
American magazine founders
American pulp magazine publishers (people)
Comic book company founders
Comic book publishers (people)
Marvel Comics people
People from Brooklyn
Deaths from pneumonia in Florida